George Augustus Wheeler, MD (July 26, 1837 – January 14, 1923) was a surgeon in the American Civil War and a prominent Maine historian. He authored two historical books including History of Brunswick, Topsham, and Harpswell, Maine, which the Pejepscot Historical Society states as the "authoritative text on the three towns through ".

Early life
Wheeler was born in Standish, Maine on July 26, 1823, to Minister Amos Dean Wheeler and Louisa Amelia Wheeler. He graduated from Bowdoin College with a Bachelor of Arts and in  received his Master's degree from Bowdoin College's Medical School of Maine.

From  to  Wheeler lived in several different towns of Maine, including Falmouth, Orland and Presque Isle.

Military career
He would later become a Sergeant of Company G. The 18th Maine would later have its name changed to the 1st Maine Heavy Artillery Regiment and disbanded after the war.

On October 4, Wheeler was commissioned assistant surgeon, U.S. Volunteers, and soon after he was appointed to take charge of the U.S. General Hospital at Annapolis Junction, Maryland, On March 30, he was commissioned Surgeon of United States Volunteers, and ordered to the Army of the Potomac and was placed in charge of the Depot Field Hospitals of the 9th Army Corps.

In the summer of  Wheeler served as medical director with a division of the 9th Army Corps; Medical Inspector of Hospitals, and later, Surgeon in charge of Field hospitals, and temporarily Medical Director of the Corps.

During the Siege of Petersburg, Wheeler was put in charge of all the Confederate Army hospitals, but owing to a change in the military command, he was relieved and ordered to Burksville Junction in Virginia, and placed in charge of transporting all the wounded to City Point, Virginia where he went with three railroad trains of the wounded.

On June 1, he was brevetted "for faithful and meritorious services" as lieutenant colonel.

Later life
After leaving the Army Wheeler practiced as a physician for a short time in Alberton, Maryland, then went to Washington, D.C. where he was employed as a surgeon by the Bureau of Refugees and Freedmen, and was in charge of the hospital in Arlington County, Virginia.

Wheeler then, was employed at Campbell General Hospital as an ass!stant surgeon. In  he moved to Topsham, Maine to practice medicine, later moving to Old Town, Maine, where he was in practice until , when he moved to Castine, Maine. While in Castine, he became a Camp Commander for the Grand Army of the Republic, a Civil War veterans organization, Post No. 76.

In  Wheeler wrote the book The History of Castine, Brooksville and Penobscot, Maine and in  co-authored with his brother, Henry Warren Wheeler, the book History of Brunswick, Topsham and Harpswell, Maine: Including the Ancient Territory Known as Pejepscot.

Wheeler was on the Board of selectmen for Castine, Maine and in  he was chosen as Chairman of the School Committee of Castine to which he was repeatedly elected. In  he was elected a member of Maine Historical Society. Wheeler was prominently connected with the Masonic Fraternity, a part of the Republican Party and a member of the Unitarian church.

Family, legacy and death

February 17, 1864, Wheeler married Mrs. Margaret Lavinia Dorsey, daughter of John F. and Elizabeth Harvercotta of Maryland. The same day he legally adopted Elizabeth Dorsey, daughter of John R. and Margaret L. Dorsey, and gave her the name Elizabeth Dorsey Wheeler. Wheeler and Dorsey had four other children: two daughters, Frederic L. Smith, Boyd Bartlett and two sons, George D. Wheeler and C. A. Wheeler. They also had three other children that passed away at young ages: Mary Charlotte (8 months old), Katherine Irene (7 months old) and Harvey Haskell (27 days old).

Later in life, as well as an established physician, Wheeler was a well respected historian. His two books, The History of Castine, Brooksville and Penobscot, Maine and the History of Brunswick, Topsham and Harpswell, Maine were heavily researched and well received. Over the years these books have been "considered by scholars as being culturally important, and is part of the knowledge base of civilization as we know it."

The later of the two books is stated by the Pejepscot Historical Society to be "considered the authoritative text on the three towns through 1878".

George Augustus Wheeler died on January 14, 1923, in Castine, Maine.

Bibliography

Notes

a.

b.
c.

References

1837 births
1923 deaths
Bowdoin College alumni
Medical School of Maine alumni
Harvard Medical School alumni
People from Standish, Maine
Historians of Maine
Union Army surgeons